Barreh Deh may refer to:
 Barreh Deh, East Azerbaijan
 Barreh Deh, Khuzestan